Summer House is a reality series that aired on ESPNU and was hosted by Chris Spielman. The show debuted on July 25, 2006 and ran for eight episodes.

Premise
The show takes six of the nation's top college football incoming freshmen and put them in a house in Chicago for one week. Summer House gives viewers an inside look at the future college football stars. The players compete against each other to be named "The King of the House". The competitors earn points for each challenge they compete in, leading up to the final day and the crowning of the "King". Between competitions and their day-to-day interactions with  each other and sports celebrities, the players learn what it takes to succeed on the field and off the field.

Production
The ESPN production was produced by Intersport, a Chicago-based production company, with head producers Michael Kolodny and Jim Gorman planning each day.  ESPN also had producers Adam Briles and Paul Gordon assist in its productions.

Special guests on the first season included Jennie Finch (USA Olympic gold medalist), Trent Green and Larry Johnson (Kansas City Chiefs), Todd Heap and Derrick Mason (Baltimore Ravens), Greg Lewis (Philadelphia Eagles), Gale Sayers (Chicago Bears Hall of Famer) and Ken Williams (Chicago White Sox GM). Mike Hall (ESPNU's signature anchor) and Bob Davie (ESPN college football analyst) also appeared. The contestants included Terrence Austin (four star wide receiver, UCLA), Jarred Fayson (four star wide receiver/quarterback, Florida), Cart Kelly (two star wide receiver/cornerback, Princeton), London Crawford (three star wide receiver, Arkansas), Cody Hawkins (three star quarterback, Colorado) and Taylor Potts (three star quarterback, Texas Tech). The show's main sponsors are Under Armour, Direct TV and Dick's Sporting Goods.

References

 Press Release: NEW REALITY SERIES: ESPNU SUMMER HOUSE

External links
ESPN.tv show page
ESPNU.com show page

ESPNU original programming
2000s American reality television series
2010s American reality television series
2006 American television series debuts
American sports television series
Television shows filmed in Illinois
Television shows set in Chicago